Christmas in the Park is the title given to annual free music concerts held in cities across New Zealand during the Christmas season.  The two largest Christmas in the Park events, held in Auckland and Christchurch since 1994, are sponsored by Coca-Cola.  They draw up to 250,000 and 100,000 spectators, respectively.  Coca-Cola refers to its Auckland Christmas in the Park production as the largest free annual event in New Zealand.  A combined total of six million New Zealanders have attended the Auckland and Christchurch events since their founding.  
Activities include music, fireworks displays, and the lighting of Christmas trees.  Each concert draws an estimated $100,000 for charity annually.

References

External links
Official website for the Auckland and Christchurch concerts

Music festivals in New Zealand
Christmas events and celebrations
Events in Auckland
Events in Christchurch
Auckland Domain